Huarochirí District (in Hispanicized spelling) or Waruchiri is one of thirty-two districts of the province Huarochirí in Peru. Despite its name, it is not the provincial seat; the seat is at Matucana.

See also 
 Rukutu
 Suyruqucha
 Wamanripa
 Yawriq

References